Kokal is one of the 57 Union councils of Abbottabad District in Khyber-Pakhtunkhwa province of Pakistan. It is located in the west of the district, near the border with Haripur District.

References

Abbottabad District